Kudra, formerly known as Jahanabad, is a town and corresponding community development block in Kaimur district  in the state of Bihar, India.  It is the third largest town in Kaimur district.  It is situated about 18 km from District Headquarter Bhabua. As of 2011, the population of Kudra (aka Jahanabad) was 30986 . The railway station in Kudra is connected to all major railway routes.

Geography 
Kudra is located at 25.05°N 83.62°E. It has an average elevation of 76 metres (249 feet). Kudra is divided in 193 wards, 75 villages with 15 panchayats (Jehanabad, Bahera, Bhadaula, Chilbili, Derwan, Devrath Kala, Khurd, Ghataon, Meura Kharhana, Newras, Pachpokhari, Sakri, Salthuan, Sasna, Siswar). There is an ancient Kali mandir at Sakri and a stadium (Nishan Singh Stadium) near High School Jehanabad. Ramlila Maidan is near Kankali Mandir where all cultural activities are carried on. In the south, there is a river called Durgawati consisting of Nauchandi and Pathlaghat.

Climate
Kudra's climate is very hot during the summer and slightly cold during the winter season. It is ideal to visit Kudra between September and December. January is the coldest month. During this time the mean minimum temperature is almost 4 degree Celsius. Temperature is at its pinnacle in the month of May when the mercury reaches almost 45 degree Celsius. Rain begins sometime in mid June and lasts till mid September. The district receives easterly winds from June to September, and from October to May wind direction reverses. It receives optimum rainfall in the months of July and August. Sometimes winter rains occur in January.

Administration
Kudra block comes under Mohania sub-division. It is divided in 193 wards, 75 villages with 15 panchayats (Jehanabad, Bahera, Bhadaula, Chilbili, Derwan, Devrath Kala, Khurd, Ghataon, Meura Kharhana, Newras, Pachpokhari, Sakri, Salthuan, Sasna, Siswar). Kudra is a part of the Mohania Vidhan Sabha constituency and Sasaram Lok Sabha constituency.

Demographics 
 India census, Kudra had a population of 17,076. Males constitute 54% of the population and females 46%. Kudra has an average literacy rate of 66%, higher than the national average of 59.5%.

The mother tongue of almost all the people in Kudra is Bhojpuri. The main occupation of most of the people is agriculture.

Economy

Kudra's economy is mainly driven by agriculture and related industries like rice polishing. The region is also known as Dhan Ka Katora, meaning "a bowl of rice".Canal irrigation system is also very prominent in this area. Because of the fertile land around the town it is a local trading center for food grains, agricultural products, and agricultural equipment. The rice grown near Kudra is sold in the markets of Kolkata and New Delhi. Kudra is also known as Industrial city of Kaimur because 10 big rice mills and 400 mini rice mills (automatic) operates at Lalapur, Sakri and Kudra. Jhunjhunwala group is also investing in Kudra and has opened a factory.

Bihar Rajya Bij Nigam 
In order to bring about complete self-sufficiency and self-reliance to meet the full active demand of quality seeds of high yielding varieties to the farmers of the State at reasonable price, the Bihar Rajya Bij Nigam, a public Limited Company, was incorporated on 18 July 1978 under the Second National Seed Project established under the Companies Act 1956 by the Govt. of India through the financial assistance of World Bank.
There are three more regional offices located at Hajipur (Vaishali), Begusarai and Bhagalpur.

Places
Ramlila Maidan 

It is a site where multipurpose activities are conducted. People attend this place in large numbers to witness Ramlila, a play based on the epic Ramayana which is followed by the burning of Ravana's giant effigy and the celebration of Dushahra. The vast ground also holds activities such as cricket matches, political rallies and trade fairs.

Kali Mandir 

It is one of the historical temples existing in Kudra town. People visit this temple in large numbers to offer their prayers to Goddess Durga.

Chaturbhuji Dham 

This temple is situated at Dumri village which is 17.2 km away from Kudra town in north direction. The statue of the temple was found around 100 years ago while ploughing the land, till then it was being worshipped by Hindu religion people. The specialty of statue is that made of black single stone of Lord Vishnu. This statue replicates the sleeping mudra of Lord Vishnu and Goddess Lakshmi is setting and pressing his feet. People visit this temple in large numbers to offer their prayers to Lord Vishnu and Goddess Lakshmi.

 Kaliasthan, Ramlila Maidan
 Maa Kankali, Ramlila Maidan
 Badka Shivala, Ramlila Maidan
 Chotka Shivala, Kudra Bazar
 Ram Janki & Maa Annpurna Mandir
 Gurudwara, G.T. Road, Kudra
 Church, Chilbili, G.T. Road, Kudra
 Mosque, Kudra Bazar

Freedom Fighters
Kudra is noted for being a town which has sacrificed quite a few freedom fighters during India's struggle for independence. Some of them:
Vashishtha Tiwari
Ram Nath Rastogi

Ramdevi Singh
Ramsurat Singh
Ramnagina Singh
Raghubir Mushar
Vanshropan Singh
Raghunath Pandey
Kansha Kandu

Sports
Cricket is the most popular sport in Kudra although football and other sports tournaments are also organised.
Nishan Singh Stadium near High School Jehanabad attracts visitors and people more in number whenever any cricket match is organized.

Transport 
Kudra is well connected to all major parts of country by both road and railways. It is one of the best accessible places in Bihar due to its position as it geographically lies between Golden Quadrilateral highway systems and Grand Chord railway line. Thus Kudra is easily accessible from Delhi and Kolkata by both road and railways.

Nearest air connectivity available from Kudra is through Varanasi Airport.

Road
Four-lane (Being Converted into 6 lanes) National Highway 19 (Grand Trunk Road, old NH 2) crosses through the heart of city. It Connects Kudra to National Capital Delhi (888 km), Kolkata (580 km), Varanasi(84 km) and Allahabad(220 km).Daily busses are available from Kudra to Varanasi through G.T. Road. The journey is of 2 hours.
 
NH 319 (old NH 30) originates from Mohania (25 km west on G.T. Road) and connect this city with the state capital Patna via Arrah through a journey of 4 hours. The town is 200 km from Patna.

Kudra is connected to its district headquarters Bhabua via State Highway 67. It is located 16 km south of Kudra. Kudra is the primary location for commuting of the people of Bhabua as it enjoys better connectivity to the rest of country.

The main mode of local transportation are buses operated by both the state government and private owners. The private buses are more frequent and easily available and connect to most of the local towns and bazaars. Small Pick-up vans are also used as a mode of local transportation from Kudra to its nearby villages.

Rail

Kudra is well connected by rail with the major Indian cities like New Delhi, Kolkata, Patna, Kanpur, Allahabad, Ranchi, Gaya, Ajmer, Dehradoon, Dhanbad, Ludhiana and Varanasi. Kudra Railway Station lies on Gaya-Mughalsarai Section of Howrah-New Delhi Grand Chord Railway line. Following list contain all major trains stopping on Kudra Railway Station. The station code is 'KTQ'.

The Train list:

Air
Lal Bahadur Shastri International Airport, Varanasi commonly known as Babatpur Airport is the nearest airport, located at a distance of 113 km from Kudra. Indian carriers including Air India, Jet Airways, Kingfisher Airlines, Spicejet, and international carriers like Air India, Thai Airways International, Korean Air and Naaz Airlines operate from here. Daily flights to Delhi, Mumbai and Kolkata are available from here.

Education

Kudra still lags behind in field of basic education. Bihar has the lowest rate of literacy in India, and Kudra shares this trend. However average literacy rate of Kudra is higher than that of Bihar. Due to the lack of sources of better education, students often choose to migrate to other cities like Ranchi, Patna and Varanasi in search of better options. However the situation is improving.

Colleges

The town has limited options for higher education.Following are the government colleges in Kudra:
 Jagdeo Memorial College
 Parmeshwarnand Mahila College

Schools
St. Joseph School,Ramlila Maidan
Saraswati Sishu Mandir
Dr.Ambedkar Aavasiye 10+2 School
St. John Public School
Paradise School Lalapur
Heaven Garden
SBM Public School
Modern Public(10+2)School,Lalapur
Bal Pratiyogita Niketan,Sakri

Facebook
https://www.facebook.com/kudrabihar

Villages 
Kudra block contains the following 159 villages:

References

External links
 Kudra

Cities and towns in Kaimur district
 Kudra is outer surface touch to Uttar Pradesh state sonvedra district river rihand daam